James Jameson Dickson (17 September 1815 – 14 November 1885) was a Scottish Swedish logging industrialist and philanthropist.

Life
Dickson was born in 1815 in Gothenburg. He was the son of James Dickson Sr. James Dickson Sr and his brother had established a timber export business that returned with British cotton goods to Sweden in exchange for the sawn timber. Dickson Jr was educated at Uppsala University. The Dickson business employed the largest merchant fleet in Sweden with offices in both Gothenburg and London.

Dickson and Oscar Dickson were credited with acts of philanthropy. The two of them helped the explorer Adolf Erik Nordenskiöld, local Gothenburg good causes and Artur Hazelius, who created Nordiska Museet.

Dickson died at his house, Överås Örgryte.

References

1815 births
1885 deaths
People from Gothenburg
19th-century Swedish businesspeople
Uppsala University alumni
Swedish people of Scottish descent
Businesspeople in timber
Swedish philanthropists
19th-century philanthropists